Mohammad Wasim Mandozai (born 23 June 1993) is an Afghan cricketer. He made his first-class debut for Amo Region in the 2017–18 Ahmad Shah Abdali 4-day Tournament on 13 November 2017. He made his List A debut for Balkh Province in the 2019 Afghanistan Provincial Challenge Cup tournament on 1 August 2019.

References

External links
 

1993 births
Living people
Afghan cricketers
Amo Sharks cricketers
Place of birth missing (living people)